Automatic fire suppression systems control and extinguish fires without human intervention. Examples of automatic systems include fire sprinkler system, gaseous fire suppression, and condensed aerosol fire suppression. When fires are extinguished in the early stages loss of life is minimal since 93% of all fire-related deaths occur once the fire has progressed beyond the early stages.

Types of automatic systems 
Today there are numerous types of automatic fire suppression systems and standards for each one. Systems are as diverse as the many applications. In general, however, automatic fire suppression systems fall into two categories: engineered and pre-engineered systems.

 Engineered fire suppression systems are design specific and most commonly used for larger installations where the system is designed for a particular application. Examples include large marine and land vehicle applications, server rooms, public and private buildings, industrial paint lines, dip tanks and electrical switch rooms. Engineered systems use a number of gaseous or solid agents with many of them being specifically formulated. Some are even stored as a liquid and discharged as a gas.
 Pre-engineered fire suppression systems use pre-designed elements to eliminate the need for engineering work beyond the original product design. Typical industrial solutions use a wet or dry chemical agent, such as potassium carbonate or monoammonium phosphate (MAP), to protect relatively smaller spaces such as distribution boards, battery rooms, engine bays, wind turbines, hazardous goods and other storage areas. A number of residential designs have also emerged that typically employ water mist and target retrofit applications.

Components
By definition, an automatic fire suppression system can operate without human intervention.  To do so it must possess a means of detection, actuation and delivery. In many systems, detection is accomplished by mechanical or electrical means.  Mechanical detection uses fusible-link or thermo-bulb detectors.  These detectors are designed to separate at a specific temperature and release tension on a release mechanism.  Electrical detection uses heat detectors equipped with self-restoring, normally-open contacts which close when a predetermined temperature is reached. Remote and local manual operation is also possible. Actuation usually involves either a pressurized fluid and a release valve, or in some cases an electric pump. Delivery is accomplished by means of piping and nozzles. Nozzle design is specific to the agent used and coverage desired.

Extinguishing agents
Water is the most prevalent fire suppression agent in use worldwide. However, the use of water does have some limitations, which can range from inadequate supplies (particularly in less developed regions) to operations and processes which are highly susceptible to water damage.  In some cases, certain contents or processes (such as water-reactive chemicals or metals, molten materials, etc.) are truly incompatible with water; water discharge could lead to explosion. In these instances, alternative chemical compounds, inert gases and similar can be utilized for fire suppression as outlined below:

Health and environmental concerns
Despite their effectiveness, chemical fire extinguishing agents are not without disadvantages. In the early 20th century, carbon tetrachloride was extensively used as a dry cleaning solvent, a refrigerant and as a fire extinguishing agent. In time, it was found carbon tetrachloride could lead to severe health effects. From the mid-1960s Halon 1301 was the industry standard for protecting high-value assets from the threat of fire.  Halon 1301 had many benefits as a fire suppression agent; it is fast-acting, safe for assets and required minimal storage space.  Halon 1301's major drawbacks are that it depletes atmospheric ozone and is potentially harmful to humans. Since 1987, some 191 nations have signed The Montreal Protocol on Substances That Deplete the Ozone Layer. The Protocol is an international treaty designed to protect the ozone layer by phasing out the production of a number of substances believed to be responsible for ozone depletion.  Among these were halogenated hydrocarbons often used in fire suppression. As a result, manufacturers have focused on alternatives to Halon 1301 and Halon 1211 (halogenated hydrocarbons). A number of countries have also taken steps to mandate the removal of installed Halon systems.  Most notably these include Germany and Australia, the first two countries in the world to require this action.  In both of these countries complete removal of installed Halon systems has been completed except for a very few essential-use applications. The European Union is currently undergoing a similar mandated removal of installed Halon systems.

History 
The first fire extinguisher patent was issued to Alanson Crane of Virginia on Feb. 10, 1863. The first fire sprinkler system was patented by H.W. Pratt in 1872. But the first practical automatic sprinkler system was invented in 1874 by Henry S. Parmalee of New Haven, CT.  He installed the system in a piano factory he owned.

Modern systems
Since the early 1990s manufacturers have successfully developed safe and effective Halon alternatives. These include DuPont's FM-200, American Pacific’s Halotron, FirePro's FPC Compound, Plumis’ Automist and 3M's Novec 1230 Fire Protection Fluid. Generally, the Halon replacement agents available today fall into two broad categories, in-kind (gaseous extinguishing agents) or not in-kind (alternative technologies). In-kind gaseous agents generally fall into two further categories, halocarbons and inert gases.  Not in-kind alternatives include such options as water mist or the use of early warning smoke detection systems.

References

External link
 Substitutes in Total Flooding Agents
 Automatic Fire Extinguishers and It’s Importance for Home Kitchens

Active fire protection
Firefighting equipment
Fire suppression
Safety equipment